Ok Taec-yeon (born December 27, 1988), known mononymously as Taecyeon, is a South Korean rapper, singer, songwriter, actor and entrepreneur. He is the main rapper of the South Korean boy band 2PM.

In 2010, Ok debuted as an actor in the Korean drama Cinderella's Sister and since then has starred in Dream High (2011), Who Are You? (2013), Wonderful Days (2014), Assembly (2015), Let's Fight, Ghost (2016), Save Me (2017), The Game: Towards Zero (2020), Secret Royal Inspector & Joy (2021) and Vincenzo (2021), as well as the movies Marriage Blue (2013) and House of the Disappeared (2017).

Early life and education
Ok was born in Seoul, South Korea, but emigrated at the age of 10, with his parents and older sister Jihyen to Bedford, Massachusetts, a small town situated in the Greater Boston Area. His sister Jihyen persuaded him to participate in a JYP Entertainment audition, whose promotion she had noticed on the Internet. After his reluctant agreement to participate, both headed for New York City on his 17th birthday. A week later he was chosen for the final 35 and got the call to go to South Korea to go further in the competition. At first Ok applied to become a model, but the judges suggested he try dancing and singing. Eventually he was named one of the dozen finalists (including his future members, Lee Junho and Hwang Chansung) to compete in the show Superstar Survival but was the first contestant to leave the show.

Ok lived in Massachusetts for seven years, attending Bedford High School where he was a member of the Chess Club, Jazz Band, JV Soccer Team, and National Honor Society, before returning to pursue his career in Korea. Ok transferred to Young Dong High School in Seoul and then studied Business Administration at Dankook University and attended Korea University Graduate School of International Studies.

He is fluent in English, Korean, and Japanese. Ok is also familiar with the use of the Busan dialect, which he used in the KBS2 drama Wonderful Days.

Music career

Debut with 2PM
In 2008 he took part in Mnet's Hot Blood Men which follows the extreme training of 13 trainees in order to become a member of the boy band One Day. One Day spawned two boy bands, 2AM and 2PM, the latter of which Ok became a member of. Six months after Hot Blood was aired on TV 2PM debuted with their first single "10 Points out of 10 Points" from their first EP Hottest Time of the Day, but it wasn't until their second EP 2:00PM Time For Change that their success in the Korean music industry skyrocketed.

Solo career
Ok was featured in Baek Ji-young's 2009 hit song "My Ear's Candy". Baek revealed that she asked Ok to feature on the song after having listened to his rap on 2PM's single "10 Points out of 10 Points".

In 2012, Ok teamed up with his fellow Dankook University alumni students to produce a digital album titled Blue Bears with Taecyeon. The album was performed live at Dankook University for the matriculation ceremony. The title song “Wings” featured penned rap lyrics written by Ok. The second song, a remake of Lee Gwangjo's  “A Night Like Tonight" was also included in the performance, with an original rap written by Ok himself. The album went on sale in February 2012, with all proceeds donated back the University.

Ok released his first solo Japanese album Taecyeon Special: Winter Hitori in 2017. As part of the solo project, he successfully held his first solo concert, "Taecyeon (From 2PM) Premium Concert" at the Tokyo Dome City Hall in Japan on January 2–3.

In July 2018, it was announced that Ok had signed an exclusive contract with 51K, an agency founded by actor So Ji-sub, following the end of his contract with JYP Entertainment. His former agency reported that he will remain as a member of 2PM despite the move.

Acting and hosting career
He formerly hosted SBS' music show Inkigayo with Wooyoung and was a permanent cast member on Family Outing 2 before it was cancelled.

In 2010 he made his acting debut in KBS drama series Cinderella's Sister alongside Moon Geun-young and Chun Jung-myung. He then starred in high school drama Dream High, which received high domestic ratings as well as international popularity.

In September 2011, FujiTV announced that Ok was going to become a regular on their Sunday drama Boku to Star no 99 Nichi, along with Japanese actor Nishijima Hidetoshi and South Korean actress Kim Tae-hee. This is his first regular role on a Japanese drama.

In February 2013, it was announced that Ok would form an on-screen couple with Taiwanese actress Emma Wu, in the Global Edition of the reality show We Got Married. The same year, he made his film debut in romantic comedy Marriage Blue. He composed two songs for the soundtrack of the film.

In 2014, he starred in KBS' weekend drama Wonderful Days, playing a tough-fisted bodyguard. The same year, he joined tvN's cooking variety show Three Meals a Day directed by Na PD. He later rejoined for a second season in 2015. Ok was praised for his hardworking image and easygoing personality on the show.

In 2015, Ok was cast in KBS' political drama Assembly. He plays an aspiring police officer who studies at the library to pass his entrance exams by day and works as an official's chauffeur by night.

In 2016, he starred in horror comedy Hey Ghost, Let's Fight with Kim So-hyun, and featured in web-drama First Seven Kisses by Lotte Duty Free.

In 2017, he starred in mystery thriller House of the Disappeared with veteran actress Kim Yunjin. He then starred in OCN's thriller drama Save Me alongside Seo Ye-ji.

In 2020, he starred in the mystery drama The Game: Towards Zero, reuniting with Lee Yeon-hee with whom he starred in the 2013 film Marriage Blue. It was his first acting role since his military discharge.

In 2021, he starred in the tvN dramaVincenzo as the main antagonist. It was his first major antagonistic role since his debut in acting. 	
In the same year, Ok also starred in the historical drama Secret Royal Inspector & Joy, which premiered on both tvN and iQiyi in November 2021.

In 2022, he played the role of Lim Jun-young, a Joseon spy who sneaks into the Japanese army camp in the war action film Hansan: Rising Dragon, the second installment of Kim Han-min's Yi Sun-sin trilogy.

Military enlistment
On December 9, 2010, a JYP spokesperson revealed that “Taec-yeon would like to give up his American permanent residence visa and recently, on December 1, he received his official confirmation for his permanent residence cancellation.”

Ok had a physical examination for drafting but received a physical body status sufficient only for enlistment as public service personnel, due to his poor vision and a dislocated shoulder back in 2008. In 2012 and 2013, he underwent surgery to correct the disk as well as to remove pins in his upper arm from a serious break in 2013. He was cleared for active duty in December 2013 but delayed his enlistment due to busy workload.

On September 4, 2017, Ok enlisted as an active-duty soldier and began his mandatory military service. On October 18, he completed his basic military training and was placed at 9th Infantry Division in Gyeonggi Province as a military instruction assistant.

In February 2018, Ok participated in various 2018 Winter Olympics events as one of the volunteers under the command of the Ministry of National Defense (South Korea). He hosted many cultural shows and concerts and performed as a member of 2PM at the Olympic Headliner Show.

On June 20, 2018, then-Prime Minister Lee Nak-yon recognized and praised Ok's efforts to enlist in active duty during his congratulatory speech at the 15th Exemplary Military Servicemen Awards, where Ok was hosting.

On October 1, 2018, Ok led the future combat system demonstration in the 70th Armed Forces Day Celebration. The demonstration introduced the Warrior Platform program, which includes new and improved combat gear and equipment. One of the event officials stated, “Corporal Ok Taec-yeon gave up his American residency; he set a great example, as he received surgery for the discs in his back and accepted active duty despite the fact that he had previously approved for alternative service. He's currently faithfully continuing his military duties. We actively recommended him to participate in the Armed Forces Day event as we believed it would be meaningful for him.”

Moreover, Ok ranked 1st on real time search engines as he also led the final salute to President Moon Jae-in.

In February 2019, Ok received an early promotion as a Sergeant for his exceptional conduct while serving as a military instruction assistant at the 9th Armed Forces Division in Gyeonggi Province.

Due to his superb records, exemplary character, and great performance, Ok was appointed as a 'Special Class Warrior' by his division commander and was awarded as 'Model Soldier' by the Ministry of National Defense. He also earned the nickname "Captain Korea" from people online, because of his physique that mirrored the famous Marvel superhero, Captain America. The nickname has been used as headlines to describe the actor on many news portals and broadcasts. In one interview, Ok expressed the pressure of having the nickname, "It was a nickname that brought a lot of pressure but it also made me want to work that much harder. I'll continue to work hard to fit that nickname."

Ok finished his military service on May 16, 2019.

Other activities

OKCAT
In 2013, Ok hosted a 30-minute press conference on ustream to introduce "Okcat", a green-colored cat character to the public. Previously, Okcat emoticons have been released on the chat application KakaoTalk. During the conference, Ok told the history of his development of the character and released his sketches to the public. The "Okcat" shop was opened on the same day and featured a line of products with the image of the Okcat.

Filmography

Film

Television series

Television film and documentary

Web series

Variety and reality shows

Discography

 Taecyeon Special: Winter Hitori (2017)

Collaborations

Original soundtrack

Awards and nominations

References

External links 

 
 

1988 births
Living people
2PM members
21st-century South Korean singers
Businesspeople from Massachusetts
Businesspeople in retailing
Dankook University alumni
English-language singers from South Korea
Japanese-language singers of South Korea
Spanish-language singers of South Korea
JYP Entertainment artists
Korea University alumni
People from Bedford, Massachusetts
People from Busan
Rappers from Massachusetts
Singers from Massachusetts
South Korean chief executives
South Korean dance musicians
South Korean expatriates in the United States
South Korean hip hop singers
South Korean male film actors
South Korean male idols
South Korean male models
South Korean male singers
South Korean male television actors
South Korean pop singers
South Korean rhythm and blues singers
South Korean male web series actors
Uiryeong Ok clan
Rappers from Seoul
Male actors from Seoul
21st-century American rappers
Bedford High School (Massachusetts) alumni